Cristóbal Guzmán Santoyo (1 November 1578 – 17 November 1656) was a Catholic prelate who served as Bishop of Palencia (1633–1656).

Biography
Cristóbal Guzmán Santoyo was born in Guzmán, Spain on 1 November 1578.
On 6 June 1633, he was appointed during the papacy of Pope Urban VIII as Bishop of Palencia.
On 29 January 1634, he was consecrated bishop by Martín Carrillo Alderete, Bishop of Oviedo. 
He served as Bishop of Palencia until his death on 17 November 1656.

Episcopal succession
While bishop, he was the principal consecrator of:
Bartolomé Santos de Risoba, Bishop of Almería (1634); 
and the principal co-consecrator of:
Gonzalo Sánchez de Somoza Quiroga, Bishop of Mondoñedo (1639); and 
Juan Queipo de Llano Flores, Bishop of Pamplona (1639).

References

External links and additional sources
 (for Chronology of Bishops) 
 (for Chronology of Bishops) 

17th-century Roman Catholic bishops in Spain
Bishops appointed by Pope Urban VIII
1578 births
1656 deaths